The Angel's Friends comic and cartoon series features a cast of characters designed by Giada Perissinotto (comic) and Igor Chimisso (cartoon). The series takes place in a fictional town, where four teenage Angels and four teenage Devils, are attending the Golden School to learn the art of being Guardian Angels and Guardian Devils, guarding and tempting the human beings, called Earthly ones. Angels come from Angie Town and are ruled by the High Spheres, while Devils are from Sulfur City and are ruled by Low Spheres.

The Angels, called Angel's Friends, are led by the main character, Raf, and are composed of her three friends Uri, Miki and Sweet, while the Devils/Demons, called Devil's Enemies, are led by Sulfus and are composed by his friends Kabale, Cabiria and Gas. The first season antagonists include a Neutral being, Reina, and her servant Maliki. Reina is imprisoned in the Limbo by High and Low Spheres because she tried to force her Earthly one to love her. Reina makes Raf and Sulfus fall in love and kiss: the sacrilege committed frees her, so that Reina can try to take revenge on Angels and Devils.

The comic, published two years before the broadcast of the cartoon and then discontinued, had far younger characters and Angels and Devils not shown in the animated version.

To realize the animated version of Raf and Sulfus, creator Simona Ferri looked at Avril Lavigne and Bill Kaulitz as models.

Angels

Raf 
The main female character of the show.

In the comic, she lives with her mother in a big house in Angie Town and is 12 stars old. She is steadfast, loyal, brave, and imaginative, but stubborn and reckless. She organizes the concerts of the band Angels, in which she is the vocalist. Her Earthly one is Andrew. She loves cooking and herbal medicine and is in love with the Earthly one Raoul. She has long blond hair, big blue eyes, pink wings, and a halo. Her mascot is the ladybug Cox, who becomes the pendant of her necklace.

In the cartoon, she is 15 "stars" old, and she's curious and lively, practical and rational, romantic and caring. She's the leader of the group Angel's Friends. She shares her thoughts and worries with a secret diary. Her Earthly one is Andrew, while her Devil rival is Sulfus. Despite this, Raf falls in love with him and, to fight this feeling, the school professors substitute Andrew with the twin girls Helen and Julia; her new Devil rival is Gas. She is jealous of Misha. Due to a birthmark on her neck, she finds out that she wasn't born an Angel, but an Earthly One. Reina tells her that her parents were two powerful sovereigns, died during the struggle between Angels and Devils, but she's actually Maliki and his wife Angelie's daughter.
Her mascot is Cox, a ladybug who rests on Raf's belt buckle. Her duty is activating Raf's Earthly One disguise.
She has long blonde hair, blue eyes, a ponytail on one side of her head, and a red highlight in her fringe. She wears sporty clothes, usually blue, white or pink.
Powers: Raf's powers are called Fast Fly and are based on both mind and body speed.
 High-Speed Wings or Speed Fly: her wings transform and allow her to speed up her flight.
 Rock Fly: temporary shield.
 Think Fly: telepathy, mind reader and can erase part of the memory.
 Inflame: a special power that allows her to shoot blue flames. It's actually a Devil power, got during a fight with Sulfus.
 Prism Fly: Raf's most powerful ability, using the Celestial-Blue chromatic essence, used to defeat Reina. In this form, Raf gains larger wings patterned with stars.

Voiced by Patrizia Mottola (original edition), Liza Kaplan (English edition)

Uri 
In the comic, Uri comes from Angie Town and she has a collection of posters and photos of Earth. She is 11 stars old. She is sweet, lively, imaginative, and fun, but careless and naive. In the band, she plays the drums. She is secretly in love with a Devil. Her Earthly one is Mara. Her passion is photography and loves telling jokes. She has dark skin, curly brown hair, green eyes, and purple wings. Her mascot is the firefly Lightning, which turns into one of her clips.

In the cartoon, she is Raf's best friend since childhood. She's keen on photography and owns a magic camera, the Digi-dream, which can take photos of people's dreams. She's sensitive, naive and dreamy, cheerful, spontaneous, and gregarious. Her Earthly one is Jennifer and her rival is Cabiria.
Her mascot is the firefly Lightning, who rests on the flower on Uri's skirt. Her duty is to activate Uri's metamorphosis into an Earthly one girl.
She has long, curly, brown twin tails, violet eyes, and caramel skin. Her clothes are usually yellow, orange and green.
Powers: Uri's powers are called Natural Fly and are based on nature.
 Flower Fly: allows the plants to grow.
 Hydro Fly: allows her to breathe and "fly" underwater for a certain time.
 Meteo Fly: allows her to change the weather.
 Jump Fly: used with the Scepter of Light in episode 1x07, it allows high jumps.
 Multi-Beast: a special power that allows her to turn into any kind of animal. It was a new power she discovered during the battle of Light and Dark. 
 Prism Fly: wings spreading the Yellow chromatic essence.

Voiced by Benedetta Ponticelli (original edition), Serra Hirsch (English edition)

Miki 
In the comic, she lives in Angie Town with her mother, who wants to dress more feminine, and is attending her second stage on Earth because the previous time was rejected. She is 9 stars, generous and sincere, but moody and abrupt. She plays the guitar and prepares the arrangements in the band. Her Earthly one is Edward. She works for the magazine  AF. She has blue hair, blue eyes, and yellow wings. She is slightly overweight and her mascot is the dragonfly Lula, who becomes the clip on her braid.

In the cartoon, she's repeating the year and is a kind and generous girl who hates Devils. She's very sporty and likes joking and having fun with friends; is also very brave and does not flinch. At first, her Devil rival is Gas and her Earthly one Matthew, then, with the separation of Raf and Sulfus, she continues watching over Matthew but the devil that stands against her is Sulfus.
Miki's mascot is Lula, a dragonfly who, when inactive, is a star in Angel's hair. Her duty is to activate Miki's metamorphosis into an Earthly one girl.
Miki wears sporty clothes, she likes flared pants, large sweatshirts, and T-shirt. Her blue hair is gathered in a braid that falls on her right shoulder; a tuft is stopped by some colored pegs, one of which is star-shaped. She has light blue eyes and her colors are blue, yellow and green.
Powers: Miki doesn't like violence, so her powers, called Defense Fly, are defensive.
 Wall Fly: raises a defensive wall in front of her.
 Gummy Fly: her wings become flaccid which allows her to return the attacks of the opponents to them.
 Sticker Fly: allows her to shoot a kind of adhesive label, sticky and slippery against the opponents.
 Ice: new power which allows her to release ice from nothing.
 Prism Fly: wings spreading the Green chromatic essence.

Voiced by Marcella Silvestri (original edition), Lisa Ortiz (English edition)

Gabe 
In the comic, Gabe was born in Angie Town, where he always comes back during the weekend. He is 11 stars, rational, clever, and lively, but careless. In the band, he plays the keyboard. His Earthly one is Alessia. Gabe is fond of puzzles and computer technology: thanks to his PDA (the Celestron), he can predict the behavior of the Earthly ones. He is secretly in love with Raf. He has light brown hair, brown eyes, and green wings, and a halo. His mascot is the bee Ginger, which turns into a carabiner, attached to a belt loop of his trousers.

In the cartoon, he is a Guardian Angel, he's called on Earth by Arkan to keep Raf away from Sulfus, pretending to be her tutor. In episode 1x21, he stops being Raf's tutor, as the Angel chooses to forget Sulfus, but he's bitten by Reina's spider and falls in love with Raf, deciding to stay by her side. After the sacrilege, he returns to Angie Town instead of Raf.
He wears an open shirt and dark trousers. Having already graduated, his wings are bigger. He has reddish-brown hair and green eyes.
Powers: his powers are called Star Fly.
 Web Fly: allows him to catch the opponent in a net.
 Maxin Fly: allows him to blind the opponent with rays of light.

Arkan 
Arkan (Arkhan in the cartoon) is one of the Angels' teachers and teaches "positive Earthly infancy". He has blue eyes, always hidden by glasses, long black hair and beard, and white wings with a yellow halo.

In the cartoon, he is the wise Angels' teacher, a stern but affectionate archangel who teaches "positive Earthly life".
He has long white hair, eyebrows and beard, and light blue eyes with his glasses on. He always wears a long, white tunic robe with blue markings and a golden Art Deco inspired and designed necklace and flower.
Powers
 Sin Fly: allows him to intercept transgressions, violence, lies, and theft.

Voiced by Mike Pollock (English edition),

Comic-only Angels

Ang-Lì 
Ang-Lì is fond of manga, is 8 stars, he wears large glasses and is quiet, tasty, and imaginative, but a lazy guy. He shares his passions with Cabiria, who he often meets to exchange material. He is the band trumpeter and saxista. His Earthly one is Jennifer. Of slender build, he has blue hair and wings. Its mascot is Zeppo, a stick insect.

Cimentus 
Professor of the Angels, he teaches "seraphic flight and poise". His hair and beard are light blue and he wears thick glasses.

Cartoon-only Angels

Sweet 
Sweet is naive, cheerful, and funny, she's able to make her friends smile at any time, even when they are sad. She likes joking but sometimes is wise. Her passion is shopping and collecting sunglasses; she also likes eating lollipops. Her Earthly one is Edward, while her Devil rival is Kabale.
Her mascot is Butterfly, who rests on her hairband. Her duty is to activate Sweet's metamorphosis into an Earthly one girl.
Her style is elegant and based on pink and lilac, colors of her hair and eyes.
Powers: Sweet's powers are called Techno Fly and are based on technology.
 Sound Fly: can emit audible sounds that make the adversary dizzy for a certain time.
 Video Fly: allows her to create holograms.
 Stop Fly: allows her to stop the time temporarily.
 Hairy Fly: her hair grows and attacks the enemy like a whip. Sweet achieves this power in the second season while fighting with Kabale.
 Prism Fly: wings spreading the Pink chromatic essence.

Voiced by Francesca Bielli (original edition), Lisa Adams (English edition)

Tyco 
An ancient Angel who lived during the Aztec era. He bears a striking resemblance to Raf, possessing similar hair (including a red highlight) and eyes. He's in love with the Devil Sai, but tries not to admit it and does everything to hide it. After committing sacrilege by kissing Sai, he is expelled from the angelic world. With his beloved, he undertakes the Path of Metamorphosis to become an Earthly one and live with her, but, even though they reach the end, they fail and Tyco is obliged to go back without her, forced to be miserable and alone for the rest of his life.
His mascot is Fulmina, a chameleon left with Sai as a memory of him.
Powers
 Radius Wing: allows him to radiate rays that strikes Cabiria.
 Scutum Wing: shield like Raf's Rock Fly.
 Cuspis Wing: throws arrows of light.
 Moltiplicatum: generates duplications of his body, like Kabale's Double Fly. Used in the movie Between Dream and Reality.
 Rubes Als: creates lightning that makes stings sprout. Used in the movie Between Dream and Reality.
 Agilis Ala: allows him to avoid attacks by opponents. Used in the movie Between Dream and Reality.

Terence 
Angels' teacher first shown in the movie, he teaches "Earthly Acting" and "Earthly Interaction". He's young and has long light brown hair tied in a ponytail, a shaggy beard, grey eyes, and big white wings. He wears an open white shirt, a black gilet, blue jeans, a fringed leather belt, a loosened grey tie, and leather boots. Sulfus believes Raf has fallen in love with him.
 Water Fly: allows him to shoot water balls. Terence uses this power in the second season on episode 10.

Omnia 
Angels' new teacher in the second season, she teaches Angelic History and Geography. She is tall and thin, has got lavender-greyish hair and lilac eyes. She wears a long dress with different shades of green.

Devils

Sulfus 
In the comic, he is 13 flashes, comes from Sulfur City, where he lives in a cave with his parents, and is repeating the year, due to failing the class several times. He is arrogant, selfish, vain and a liar, but he is afraid of doctors. He is in love with Raf. In the Devil's band, he plays the bass. He is fond of rafting, surfing, scuba diving, and hacking; he loves dating girls. He has long blue hair, golden eyes, and red wings. His mascot is the snake Basilisk.

In the cartoon, he is the leader of the group Devil's Enemies. He's 16, cold, implacable, arrogant, vain, not afraid of anything, and is often violent and overbearing. He likes teasing Raf, who has fallen in love with him at first sight. His Earthly one is Andrew, while his Angel rival is Raf. Due to their mutual feelings, they're parted and Sulfus's new rival is Miki. He's jealous of Gabe because he's always around Raf.
His mascot is Basilisk, a coral snake. When he's not active, he turns into the tattoo on his master's right forearm.
Sulfus dresses like a motorcyclist, using red, black, or grey-colored leather jackets and trousers. He has dark blue hair, amber eyes, and a red star around his left eye.
Powers: Sulfus's powers are based on physical contact and are called Power Fly.
 Fire Fly: allows him to shoot fireballs.
 Macro Fly: allows him to grow his size.
 Body Fly: his strength and musculature grow.
 Recover: used only in 1x26, used to heal wounds. It's actually an Angel power, got because he was concerned for Raf and his desire to protect her.
 Iron Fly: allows him to shoot pieces of iron. Sulfus achieves this power in the second season.
 Smash Fly: his fists get stronger. Sulfus achieves this power in the second season.
 Prism Fly: wings spreading the Red chromatic essence.

Voiced by Simone D'Andrea (original edition), Jason Griffith (English edition)

Kabale 
In the comic, she comes from Sulfur City, where she has a book of potions and experiments. She is 10, cheerful and intelligent, but tends to cheat and her smile makes her look a bit crazy. She is the "right arm" of Sulfus. She likes creating potions, playing, and cheating at gambling. She is a guitarist. Her Earthly one is Edward. She has tied blonde and red hair, purple eyes, and purple wings. Her mascot is the bat Nosferatu.

In the cartoon, Kabale is a friend of Sulfus's, she's always smiling and, because of this, looks a bit crazy. She loves challenges and gambling. During the stage her Earthly one is Edward and her rival is Sweet. She's in love with Sulfus, thereby making her the least approving of the love-hate relationship between him and Raf.
Her mascot is Nosferatu, a bat resting on her bracelet with studs.
She has a punk and flashy look, she usually wears miniskirts, adherent dresses, and boots, mainly in pink, grey, and black. She has short dark red hair and amber eyes.
Powers: her powers are called Transformer Fly and allows her to change her appearance.
 Invisible Fly: turns her invisible.
 Double Fly: allows her to multiply.
 Metamor Fly: allows her to transform into anything.
 Prism Fly: wings spreading the Violet chromatic essence.

Voiced by Emanuela Pacotto (original edition), Summer Crockett Moore (English edition)

Cabiria 
In the comic, Cabiria is 11 flashes, is smart and elegant, but very touchy and introverted, has a large library/video library in Sulfur City. Cabiria is also something of an oddity amongst her diabolic peers; she is very compassionate and genuinely sympathetic, not only to her friends but also to her human charges (and recently, even towards the Angels themselves). And while she relishes tempting humanity (and causing grief for the Angels in the process) as much as the other Devils do, Cabiria is often the first to regret her own actions if they somehow set a chain of events that might endanger the human in question. She is a friend of Ang-Lì's, who shares her passions: cinema (especially silent films of the 1930s) and reading (gothic books and comics). She is the drummer of the Devils. Her Earthly one is Alessia. She has short purple hair and wings and yellow eyes. Her mascot is the spider Aracno.

In the cartoon, she is stubborn and determined and doesn't give up easily. She is melancholic, cold, calculating, and the most intelligent in her group. She spends a lot of time pondering and adores deceiving others and weaving intrigues. She is fascinated by the creatures of the night and even has the power to summon and control beasts. She's Kabale's best friend. During the stage, she tempts Jennifer and fights against Uri.
Her mascot is Aracno, a spider, who, when inactive, turns into one of her earrings.
She has black hair, two lilac tufts, and red eyes. She always wears purple trousers and a vest.
Powers: her powers are based on darkness and are called Dark Fly.
 Night Fly: allows her to spread black smoke, blinding the opponent.
 Wild Fly: allows her to invoke wild animals.
 Dry Fly: this allows her to create a dry wind that dries everything around.
 Wind Fly: used only in episode 1x12, makes her fly faster.
 Hypnosis: allows her to hypnotize the others.
 Web Fly: allows her to create a huge spider web. Cabiria achieves this power in the second season.
 Prism Fly: wings spreading the Blue chromatic essence.

Voiced by Maddalena Vadacca (original edition), Lisa Ortiz (English edition)

Gas 
In the comic, he is the dumbest and weakest Devil, who thinks only about food, video games, and sleeping. He is the favorite victim of his companions' jokes, especially Sulfus's. Keyboardist of the band of the Devils, he has short orange hair and blue wings.

A friend of Sulfus's who is not very bright, in the cartoon he is overweight due to his love of food. His Angel rival is Miki, later Raf. He's in love with his teacher, Temptel. He tries to act tough but is the most harmless Devil. He likes body piercing.
His mascot is Croak the frog, who rests on his bracelet with studs.
He has short orange hair and brown eyes, even though he always wears sunglasses. He usually wears dark red, black or lilac T-shirts and large trousers.
Powers
 Quake Fly: allows him to create an earthquake
 Burger Fly: creates huge rock balls.
 Fat Fly: creates a wave that once it hits the opponent he or she becomes really fat and unable to move temporarily.
 Magnetic-Force: allows him to call weapons and metal objects.
 Toxic Fly: creates a cloud of toxic gas. Gas achieves this power in the second season.
 Prism Fly: wings spreading the Orange chromatic essence.

Voiced by Luca Bottale (original edition), Dan Green (English edition)

Temptel 
Temptel is the same both in the comic and in the cartoon. She is the Devils' teacher. Gas is in love with her, but he's not returned. She teaches "negative Earthly life" in the cartoon and "negative Earthly infancy" in the comic.
She has long maroon hair, wears glasses, and a long blue dress.
Powers
 Guilty Fly: intercepts offenders.
 Fust Fly: widens cracks on the walls.

Comic-only Devils

Mephisto 
Singer of the band of the Devils, Mephisto ) is 12 flashes, rude and ignorant, he loves music (especially heavy metal) and is always listening to his mp3 player. His Earthly one is Jennifer. He has long brown and green hair and purple wings. His mascot is the gecko Okkio.

Putzo 
One of the Devils' teachers, he teaches "alchemical curses". He has short black hair and green wings and wears a red alb.

Cartoon-only Devils

Misha 
Just like Gabe, she is a Guardian Devil already graduated. Her duty is to keep Sulfus far from Raf. She's bitten by Reina's spider and falls in love with Sulfus, causing Raf's jealousy. After the sacrilege, she returns to Sulfur City instead of Sulfus right after letting him be with Raf.
She has wavy fiery red hair and red eyes. She wears a short, black, red and fuchsia dress.
Powers
 Aromatic Fly: releases a perfume that seduces the adversary.

Sai 
Voiced by Veronica Taylor (English edition)

An ancient Devil lived in the Aztec era, she looks a lot like Sulfus (she has blue hair and a star tattooed on one of her eyes). She's in love with Angel Tyco but, unlike him, she isn't afraid of admitting her feelings. After committing sacrilege by kissing Tyco, she was expelled from the diabolic world. With her beloved, she undertakes the Path of Metamorphosis to become an Earthly one and live with him, but, even though they reach the end, they fail and Tyco is obliged to go back without her, who remains at the end of the Path, forced to be miserable and alone for life.
Her mascot is Gricera, a tarantula left with Tyco as a memory of her.
Powers
Agilis Wing: allows her to avoid attacks by opponents.
Ignis Wing: creates fire, like Fire Fly used by Sulfus.

Zebel 
A Devil of late 1800, he contended the soul of Maliki to Reina. After the disappearance of Maliki's wife, Angelie, Zebel managed to take him to the wrong path. He witnessed Reina's attempt to make Maliki fall in love with her using a love potion and tried to stop her when she decided to go to the Golden Castle to steal Maliki's portrait, but failed.
Of stocky build, he had short black hair and red eyes. He wore loose black, gray, and red clothes.
Powers
 Rope Fly: generates a rope that traps the opponent.

Scarlett 
Young Devils' professor first shown in the movie, like Terence she teaches "Earthly Acting" and "Earthly Interaction". She has blonde wavy hair, blue eyes, and red wings. She wears a long black dress and has a tattoo resembling a scorpion tail on her right eye.

Gnosis 
Devils' new professor on the second season, teaches diabolic history and geography. He is fat, short, has got little grey hair, small round glasses, and orange wings. He wears a brown jacket, a yellow and green shirt, an orange tie, and green pants. He also has got a devil's tail.

Earthly ones

Andrew 
In the comic, Andrew is a liar, guarded by Raf and entangled by Sulfus.

In the cartoon, Andrew is the 14-year-old boy protected by Raf and tempted by Sulfus. Since episode 1x10, because of the decision, made by Arkhan and Temptel, to separate the Angel and the Devil, he's not guarded by them anymore. He has a younger sister and loves playing video games. He's Jennifer's boyfriend. In the first novel, he finds out he has been adopted.

Jennifer 
In the comic, Jennifer is the Earthly one guarded by Ang-Lì and entangled by Mephisto.

In the cartoon, Jennifer is the young Earthly one guarded by Uri and Cabiria. Unlike the other girls, she has a natural look and doesn't wear trendy clothes. She's Andrew's girlfriend.

Edward 
In the comic, Edward is a miser boy with a passion for business protected by Miki and ensnared by Kabale. He is in love with Mara.

In the cartoon, Edward is the boy guarded by Sweet and Kabale. His parents are divorced and he lives with his mother, even if sometimes he meets his father. He comes from a wealthy family and is in love with Jennifer.

Comic-only Earthly Ones

Alessia 
Tender but gruff and cantankerous, she behaves like a tomboy. She has a passion for chemistry and she is the younger sister of Raoul. She is the Earthly one of Gabi and Cabiria.

Mara 
She is the creative Earthly one guarded by Uri and tempted by Gas.

Raoul 
The Earthly one Raf is in love with, he's the elder brother of Alessia.

Cartoon-only Earthly ones

Matthew 
Matthew is Miki and Gas's Earthly one. Later in season one, Gas is replaced by Sulfus. During the trial after the sacrilege, he's tempted by Cabiria. He plays the electric guitar.

Julia and Helen 
Julia and Helen are two rich twins, just moved to the city. They don't trust others because their previous friends were only interested in their money. Their Angel is Raf, while their Devil is Gas. During the trial after the sacrilege, Raf is replaced with Uri. They have a crush on Matthew.

Bully Boyz 
Group formed by Darius, three bullies who enjoy teasing others and make a disaster.

Bad Girlz 
Group formed by Federica, Annalisa, and Fabiana, three trendy girls who love fashion, but are shallow and mean. They enjoy making fun of other girls like Jennifer, Julia, and Helen.

Angelie 
Maliki's wife and Raf's mother, she disappeared in a vortex while playing with baby Raf in the garden of the Mistery House. She's sleeping in a glass prison, imprisoned by Cassidy and Kubral, even though she often manages to get in touch with her daughter.

Voiced by Veronica Taylor (English edition)

Daniel 
Daniel is the new Earthly One guarded and tempted by Raf and Sulfus in the second season. He has got short brown hair and eyes of the same color, he wears a dark grey jacket, an orange shirt, and blue pants. He is poor and helps his father in the car workshop he holds, he also has got two older brothers who are gangsters, they steal and sell illegal drugs.

Catherine 
Catherine is the new Earthly One guarded and tempted by Miki and Gas in the second season. She has got long brown hair caught in two small pigtails and light green eyes, she wears a pink jacket and a blue skirt. She has got a big family, her parents are divorced and married to other people, but they all live in the same house. She has got three other brothers and three other sisters, the youngest of the brothers is named Milo.

Sara Jane 
Sara Jane is the new Earthly One guarded and tempted by Cabiria and Uri in the second season. She is very diligent and serious, she plays piano and has got a very stern mother who keeps telling her to concentrate on her studies without thinking of other stuff. She is blonde and has got brown eyes, she wears a short-sleeved pink shirt, jeans, a purple beret, and white boots.

Lily 
Lily is the new Earthly One guarded and tempted by Sweet and Kabale in the second season. She has got a crush on her childhood friend, Alexander, who doesn't feel the same for her, he is in love with Gloria. She has got short brown hair and eyes of the same color. She wears a green scarf, a yellow long-sleeved shirt underneath a short-sleeved dark purple one, and jeans.

Alexander 
Alexander is Lily's childhood best friend who is in love with Gloria. Sweet is also in love with him. He has got short brown hair and dark blue eyes, he wears a yellow shirt and jeans.

Gloria 
Gloria is a friend of Lily who is also in love with Alexander, Lily always tries to separate them, trying to make them think that none of their feelings are mutual. She has got long and wavy orange hair and light blue eyes, she wears a long lilac dress.

Milo 
Milo is Catherine's little brother, who loves her a lot. He has got short brown hair and eyes of the same color.

Mirko 
Mirko is Daniel's rival, he is always messing up with him because Daniel doesn't have money while Mirko has a lot, he loves challenging him. He is blond and has got green eyes.

William 
William is a rival of Sara Jane at school, they always battle to be the best in class but outside they hang out together and are friends. Sara Jane has got a crush on him. He has got blond hair and green eyes.

Enemies

Maliki 
In the comic, Maliki is a former Devil who has given away eternal life because he loved a human woman, Vera. When she left him, the man decided to take revenge on Angels, Devils, and Earthly ones, evoking the Relieves against them.

In the cartoon, Maliki is a mysterious hooded man, a slave of Reina. He was an alchemist in 1800 and Reina's Earthly one; he turns out to be Raf's true father. He sacrifices his life to save his daughter.
Powers
 Black Shield: given to him by the Black Sphere created by Reina, creates a shield around him.

Voiced by Dan Green (English edition)

Cartoon only enemies

Reina 
The main enemy of season 1. She is a ruthless, cruel, and arrogant 27-year-old Neutral (neither Angel nor Devil). She wants to take revenge on Angels and Devils because they have trapped her in the Limbo. In her past story, she was an Angel, who falls in love with her Earthly one, Maliki. To make him love her, she stole his portrait in the Room of Portraits, subjecting him to her will. Because of this sacrilege, she was imprisoned in the Limbo. She wants Raf and Sulfus to kiss because a second sacrilege will set her free. She's defeated by Raf using Prism Fly.

Her mascot was the beetle Scarap, who turned into a brooch.

At the end of season 2, Blue released her from the door of Limbo.

As a Neutral, she has long cerulean hair, yellow eyes, and two tattoos. As an Angel, she had long light blue hair, wore white and blue clothes, and had yellow wings.
Powers (as an Angel)
 Electric Fly: an electric shock hits the opponent.

Voiced by Summer Crocket Moore (English edition)

Pherox 
Monstrous animals that live in the Limbo, they look like small, black, and white monkeys with red eyes. They have a venomous bite.

Blue 
Blue is one of the enemies of season 2. She works for the kidnappers of Angelie and follows their orders because they promised her that they would help her people. Blue ends up falling in love with Sulfus but then wants revenge because he used her feelings to escape the prison he was being held in. She has got long blue hair and red eyes. She wears a long black coat with purple spirals and purple leggings.

Powers
 Hypnosis: She has the power to hypnotize anyone who looks directly into her eyes.
 Panther Claw: Her nails grow and become very sharp, cutting anything on their way.

Cassidy 
She is one of the two main enemies of Season 2. Being the new Angels' teacher, she is also the kidnapper of Angelie whose reasons for such a thing are still unknown. She along with her partner want to destroy the V.E.T.O's scales so a new war can begin. In the past, she was the general of the angelic army on the 100 years war but because no one was winning, a trade came up which was the V.E.T.O, who was sealed in a temple. Cassidy was against the trade and so was expelled from her general place.

She has got wavy and long light orange hair and light blue eyes. As a teacher she wears a long white and golden coat, as an enemy, she wears armor that reminds her of the samurai and medieval armors, she also wears a mask that only allows her eyes to be seen.

Powers
 Mirror Shield: creates a protective barrier that sends the enemy's attack back to where it came from.

Kubral 
Together with Cassidy, he is the other main enemy of Season 2. He wants to destroy the V.E.T.O's scales for the same reason as Cassidy, he was the general of the diabolic and demonic army during the 100 years war but just like Cassidy, he disagreed with the trade and was then expelled from his place. He is also the new professor of the Devils.

He has got short grey (brown in flashbacks) hair and red eyes. As a professor he wears a dark blue jacket and brown clothes, as an enemy, he wears basically the same thing as Cassidy, a samurai and medieval-styled armor and a mask that only allows his eyes to be seen.

Powers
Electricity: He uses a field of electricity around him that electrocutes anyone who dares to touch him.

External links 
  Characters profiles at the official website

References 

Angel's Friends
Angel's Friends